John Riegger (born June 13, 1963) is an American professional golfer who has played on the PGA Tour, the Web.com Tour, and the Champions Tour.

Riegger was born in Metropolis, Illinois. He graduated from Lamar University in 1985 and turned professional that year.

Riegger played on the PGA Tour in 1987, 1992, 1998, 2001–04, 2006, and 2008. He played on the Nationwide Tour in 1991, 1994, 1999–2000, 2007, 2009–10. He has won twice on the Nationwide Tour. His best finish on the PGA Tour was a T5 at the 2006 John Deere Classic.

Professional wins (3)

Nationwide Tour wins (2)

*Note: The 2010 Rex Hospital Open was shortened to 54 holes due to rain.

Champions Tour wins (1)

Results in major championships

CUT = missed the halfway cut
Note: Riegger only played in The Open Championship.

Results in The Players Championship

CUT = missed the halfway cut

Results in senior major championships
Results not in chronological order before 2022.

"T" indicates a tie for a place
CUT = missed the halfway cut
WD = withdrew
NT = No tournament due to COVID-19 pandemic

See also
1986 PGA Tour Qualifying School graduates
1991 PGA Tour Qualifying School graduates
1997 PGA Tour Qualifying School graduates
2000 Buy.com Tour graduates
2001 PGA Tour Qualifying School graduates
2003 PGA Tour Qualifying School graduates
2007 Nationwide Tour graduates

References

External links

American male golfers
Lamar Cardinals golfers
PGA Tour golfers
PGA Tour Champions golfers
Korn Ferry Tour graduates
Golfers from Illinois
Golfers from Nevada
People from Metropolis, Illinois
Sportspeople from Las Vegas
1963 births
Living people